Shantaram may refer to any of the following:
V. Shantaram (1901–1990), Indian filmmaker, film producer and actor
Shantaram (novel), a novel written by Gregory David Roberts
Shantaram (TV series), a TV series based on the novel of the same name